Al Masrouhiya is a village in Qatar, located in the municipality of Al Daayen.

Etymology
The village derives its name from the Arabic term 'saraha', which roughly translates to "allow to wander in search of forage". As the site of a large rawdat (depression), rainfall would accumulate in the rawdat, facilitating plant growth. These plants would then be grazed upon by the goats of nomadic herdsman passing through the area.

Geography
Located near the eastern shores of Al Daayen, Al Masrouhiya borders:
Rawdat Al Hamama to the south, separated by Wadi Al Wasah Street.
Wadi Lusail to the west, separated by Street 1707.
Lusail to the east, separated by Al Khor Coastal Road.

References

Populated places in Al Daayen